On 15 November 2017, the Argentine submarine  disappeared off the coast of Argentina while on a training exercise. After a search lasting 15 days, the Argentine Navy downgraded the operation from a rescue mission to a search for the submarine's wreck, implying they had given up any hope of finding survivors among its crew of 44.

Background 

, a  diesel-electric submarine in service with the Argentine Navy since 19 November 1985, was built in West Germany by Thyssen Nordseewerke. She was laid down on 18 March 1982 and launched on 20 June 1983. San Juan underwent a mid-life update from 2008 to 2013, which included replacing all battery elements.

In early November 2017, San Juan was part of a navy exercise in Tierra del Fuego which included the sinking of the ex  as a target. With the war game completed and after a short visit to Ushuaia open to the public, the submarine got underway to her home base at Mar del Plata.

Disappearance and rescue efforts 
There were at least 44 servicemen on board the missing submarine, including Argentina's first female submarine officer, Eliana Krawczyk. The submarine carried oxygen for no more than seven days when submerged.

On the same day, Argentine president Mauricio Macri moved to the official residence at Chapadmalal, near Mar del Plata, in order to follow the search and rescue operation more closely. The Argentine Armed Forces set up a centre of operations at the naval base in Mar del Plata, with family members of the submariners also present at the base. The Argentine Navy brought in a team of mental health professionals to aid the families; a team to keep them updated on the search and rescue effort had also been set up.
Also on 17 November, the International Charter 'Space and Major Disasters' was activated by the Secretaría Nacional de Protección Civil de Argentina, thus providing for humanitarian satellite coverage.

On 18 November, the Ministry of Defense reported that there had been attempts at communication that day from a satellite phone that was believed to be from the submarine, but it was later determined that the calls were not from the vessel.

On 19 November, the Argentine Armed Forces stated that severe weather with  waves in the area was hampering the search effort and that weather conditions would not be favourable until 21 November.

On 20 November, the Argentine Navy announced that the "critical phase" for the rescue was approaching. Although the submarine had enough supplies to last 90 days above water, she only had enough oxygen for 7–10 days submerged and it was speculated that she was submerged when communications were lost given the rough weather. The Navy also stated that if the issue had simply been a communications failure, then San Juan would have arrived at Mar del Plata on 19 or 20 November. The Argentine Navy later reported that sonar systems on two of its ships and sonar buoys dropped by a US P-8A Poseidon aircraft detected noises possibly coming from San Juan; a senior United States Navy officer told CNN that this sounded like banging on the hull in order to alert passing ships; later analysis of the audio determined that the sound "did not correspond to a submarine", and was probably of biological origin. The Royal Navy stated that  waves had slowed the search, but easing weather led to improved sonar conditions.

Weather conditions improved, with  waves, making the search for the submarine less difficult. There was no official confirmation from the Argentine Navy whether the object was indeed San Juan, but sources told Clarín newspaper that a fleet in the area led by the corvette  was given orders to proceed "at full speed" towards where the object was detected. At 7:00 pm the British ship , in her maritime patrol area, had seen three flares to the east: one orange and two white. This information was reported to Puerto Belgrano where the Search and Rescue Coordinating Center is set up. The Argentine Navy later determined that both the flares and heat signature were false leads.

On 22 November, the Argentine Navy investigated a "hydroacoustic anomaly" identified on 15 November, three hours after the last contact of the lost submarine; ships and airplanes were sent back to the last contact point with ARA San Juan. During a search flight over the South Atlantic, a U.S. P-8A Poseidon aircraft detected an object near the area where the missing submarine sent her last signal. The plane returned to base in Bahía Blanca late the same day.

The Navy received information through the Argentine ambassador in Austria since the CTBTO is based in Vienna. The organization had been asked to analyse data from the search area by the Argentine government on the week of the disappearance, but no leads had materialised until 22 November when the CTBTO informed the government. In a press conference, the Argentine Navy stated that it had not ruled out any possibilities since the submarine had not been located yet, and a spokesperson requested that the media be more precise when reporting information following "imprecise information which affects the family members." The Navy added that it received information on the explosion on the afternoon of 22 November, adding that it would have concentrated search efforts in that area had it known sooner.

On 24 November, the search and rescue operation was reinforced by the Brazilian submarine rescue ship Felinto Perry. The arrival of a Russian Navy exploration aircraft was also expected. More than 30 aircraft and ships from Argentina, the United Kingdom, Brazil, the United States, Chile and other countries participated in the effort to find San Juan.

On 26 November, the Argentine Navy said that "despite 11 days of searching, it doesn't rule out that [the crew] could be in an extreme survival situation" and were not willing to draw any conclusions until the submarine had been located.

On 27 November, Argentine Navy spokesman Captain Enrique Balbi revealed to the press that according to the submarine's last report from 15 November, San Juans snorkel leaked water into the forward storage batteries the day before, which ignited a fire. After extinguishing the fire, the crew disconnected the forward storage batteries. The submarine continued to move powered by the aft batteries.

On 30 November, 15 days after San Juan went missing, the Navy declared the rescue part of the operation to be over, turning its attention to finding the submarine and not her crew. At the time, the loss of 44 crewmen constituted the largest loss of life aboard a submarine since the Chinese submarine 361 sank in May 2003. The incident is also the second worst naval disaster in Argentina during peacetime after the loss of the minesweeper ARA Fournier with her complement of 77 off Tierra del Fuego on 22 September 1949.

Search effort 

The nuclear-powered  was located five months after sinking, largely thanks to data obtained from SOSUS. The Israeli submarine  was located in 1999, 31 years after her disappearance. The Australian submarine , disappeared in September 1914, was found in December 2017 (103 years later) after 13 search efforts.

As of 21 November 2017, when including vessels and aircraft making their way to the search area, the Ministry of Defense stated that there were 27 ships and 18 aircraft participating in the search and rescue of San Juan. Of those, 18 ships and 5 aircraft were Argentine, with the remaining 9 ships and 13 aircraft belonging to the 11 other countries which had offered assistance. There were also tens of fishing vessels assisting in the search. The operation was carried out under the auspices of ISMERLO, an international organisation of over 40 countries set up in 2003 following the Kursk submarine disaster.

On 24 November, according to the Argentine Navy, 27 ships, 30 aircraft, 4,000 professionals from 13 countries participated in the search effort to the missing Argentine submarine; this was already the largest search and rescue operation in the history of the South Atlantic Ocean.

International assistance largely ended by early 2018 leaving Argentina as the only country involved in the search. On 14 February 2018 the Argentine Government offered a reward of $98 million pesos (approximately USD 5 million) for information on the location of ARA San Juan.

Ocean Infinity search 
From September 2018 the search for the submarine was aided by the US-based seabed survey company Ocean Infinity. The search started on 7 September 2018, and was planned for up to 60 days, with payment only in the event that the submarine was found. Some 60 crew members conducted the search, with three officers of the Argentine Navy and four family members of the crew of ARA San Juan to observe.

The Norwegian ship  was to arrive in the area at 23:30 and investigation with a ROV was to begin. It had been considered that the probability of locating the wreck in the area where it was eventually found was 90%, but previous searches failed to find it due to inadequate technology and presence of numerous submarine canyons.

Photographs were released showing it broken into several pieces on the ocean floor. Argentine Navy spokesman Captain Jorge Balbi presented close-up photos of the wreck in a press briefing.

Ocean Infinity will receive a reward of US$7.5 million for finding the missing vessel.

Consequences and repercussions 
On 16 December 2017, the Argentine defence minister dismissed the Navy's Chief of the General Staff (Marcelo Srur) –the head of Argentine Navy– after the incident. On 4 February 2018 the Argentine news site Infobae published two documents handed by the Argentine Navy to the judge in charge of investigating the accident, detailing how the mission of the submarine included spying on British civil and military vessels in the South Atlantic, near the Falkland Islands.

Participants of the rescue and search efforts

Commemoration
On 24 October 2021 a monument commemorating the 44 crew members lost was unveiled in front of the Mar del Plata Naval Base.

See also 

 List of people who disappeared mysteriously at sea
 List of submarine incidents since 2000

Notes

References

External links 

  Argentine Navy official website – Submarine Force page (Poder Naval – Fuerza de Submarinos – Unidades  (accessed 2017-12-09)
  Argentine Navy official website dedicated to the search with updates 
  Argentine Navy official Twitter account with most recent updates

2010s missing person cases
2017 in Argentina
Maritime incidents in 2017
Maritime incidents in Argentina
Missing person cases in Argentina
November 2017 events in South America
Shipwrecks in the Atlantic Ocean
Submarine accidents
People lost at sea